Aechmea patriciae is a species of flowering plant in the family Bromeliaceae. It is endemic to Ecuador.  Its natural habitat is subtropical or tropical moist lowland forests. It is threatened by habitat loss.

References

Flora of Ecuador
patriciae
Vulnerable plants
Taxonomy articles created by Polbot